North Wing Design is an American aircraft manufacturer, specializing in hang gliders, light-sport aircraft and ultralight trikes. The company was based in East Wenatchee, Washington and later moved to Chelan, Washington.

The company makes its own sails and wings, and supplies more wings to other North American trike manufacturers, such as Wettrike, than any other manufacturer.

Aircraft

References

External links

Aircraft manufacturers of the United States
Ultralight trikes